may refer to:

Location

Surname
  (1677–1752), Japanese judge, known in English juvenile literature as "Ooka the Wise" or "Solomon in Kimono"
  (1909–1988), an author
  (1931–2017), a poet

See also 
 Oka (disambiguation)
 Ōka (disambiguation)

Japanese-language surnames